Birtwistle is a surname. Notable people with that surname or similar surnames include:

Adam Birtwistle (born 1959), British artist
Alexander Birtwistle (born 1948), retired British Army officer
 Archibald Cull Birtwistle (1927–2009), retired British Army officer
Eva Birthistle, Irish actress and writer
Gordon Birtwistle (born 1943), British Liberal Democrat politician
Harrison Birtwistle (1934–2022), British contemporary composer
Iris Birtwistle (1918–2006), English poet and gallery owner
Margaret Birtwistle (1925–1992), British track and field athlete
Mark Birtwistle (born 1962), New Zealand rugby union player
Sue Birtwistle (born 1945), producer and writer of television drama
Thomas Birtwistle (1833–1912), English trade unionist and factory inspector

See also
Birtles (disambiguation)
Birtley (disambiguation)

English-language surnames
Surnames of English origin